= Olympic and Paralympic Games 2012 =

Olympic and Paralympic Games 2012 refers to the 2012 Summer Olympics and 2012 Summer Paralympics.
